(born May 16, 1972) is a Japanese composer and DJ who primarily does work for video games. Naganuma is best known for his score for the game Jet Set Radio and its sequel Jet Set Radio Future.

Early life
Naganuma started his musical career by playing the electronic organ, aged five, under the influence of his older sister. When he was fourteen, he became interested in western music and composed his own songs. He then decided to have a job in the music business. During 1993 to 1997 he worked as both a DJ and bartender. He was also aiming to become a singer-songwriter in the J-pop industry, although he dropped this plan.

Career

19982008: Work with Sega 
Naganuma sent demo tapes to Sega in 1998. His application was accepted, with voice editing for Shoujo Kakumei Utena: Itsuka Kakumei Sareru Monogatari and composition for Hip Jog Jog being among his first works with the company, the latter of which he worked with senior composer Kenichi Tokoi.

In 2000, he served as the lead composer for Jet Set Radio, serving as his breakthrough work. He took inspiration from big beat music for the game. He would go on to compose for its sequel Jet Set Radio Future in 2002, along with Ollie King in 2003, also developed by Smilebit. In 2005, he composed a large portion of Sonic Rush soundtrack, of which he was later nominated at the Golden Joystick Awards for Soundtrack of the Year. The following year, he was responsible for music supervision and composing two tracks for the anime adaption of Air Gear, itself being influenced by Jet Set Radio. For contractual reasons, he used the "skankfunk" alias as he was still employed at Sega at the time, while Air Gear had nothing to do with Sega. He also created a remix of "Fuusen Gum" for the anime Gin Tama, but similarly was not credited at the time.

During his later years with Sega, Naganuma was part of Yakuza team, where his role was mostly limited to voice editing and producing sound effects. The boss of its team did not allow him to work on the soundtrack of Sonic Rush Adventure. Following his work on Yakuza Kenzan in 2008, he left Sega to become a freelance composer. He has continued to work on Sega games under the skankfunk alias, including Kurohyō: Ryū ga Gotoku Shinshō and Super Monkey Ball 3D.

2008present: Freelance work 
During the earlier years following his departure from Sega, Naganuma contributed a handful of tracks to various Sega games such as Kurohyō: Ryū ga Gotoku Shinshō and Super Monkey Ball 3D, under the skankfunk alias. In 2012, he contributed the track "Luv Can Save U" for the 20th installment of Konami's arcade rhythm game Beatmania IIDX, and for the 21st installment an extended mix of the aforemented track. In 2014, Naganuma contributed to the charity CD Game Music Prayer II for relief of the 2011 Great East Japan Earthquake with an original track titled "Aria di Maria".

By the late 2010s, he became popular on the social network platform Twitter, where he frequently interacts with fans and posts internet memes and shitposts related to Jet Set Radio and other media, such as Family Guy, Among Us, Juuni Senshi Bakuretsu Eto Ranger, or  Big Chungus.

As a result of his online popularity and musical success, he has contributed tracks to a number of indie games inspired by Jet Set Radio. In 2017, Naganuma contributed two new original songs for the game Hover. In 2018, Naganuma released the track "Ain't Nothin' Like a Funky Beat" as a part of the Lethal League Blaze soundtrack, which featured other notable composers such as Frank Klepacki, Pixelord, Bignic, and Klaus Veen. He was set to compose for Streets of Rage 4, but due to schedule complications and copyright ownership issues, he withdrew from the project in 2020.

Naganuma admitted that since leaving Sega, he has made attempts to work for Nintendo, after the topic was brought up by fans of the Splatoon franchise that he should have worked on the latest games' soundtrack, who drew parallels between it and his previous works. He is composing for indie game Bomb Rush Cyberfunk, which is set to be released in 2023. He has also expressed a desire to create an original album and clarified he is not active in the gaming industry.

Musical style 
Naganuma's early sound is often labelled as an energetic, rhythm-heavy blend of hip hop, electronic, dance, funk, jazz, and rock. His music was produced to match the visual style of the games he was working on as closely as possible, and experimented with voices, cutting and rearranging samples to the point that they become nonsensical. Since the release of Jet Set Radio, Naganuma's sound has incorporated many elements of breakbeat, gabber, and EDM.

Discography

As video game composer 
Sole composer unless noted otherwise.

As other 
These are for media which Naganuma did not serve as main composer, but still contributed original music.

Video games

Anime

Original songs and remixes

Production credits 
These are for video games which Naganuma has been credited for roles other than as a composer.

Notes

References

External links
 Interview at RocketBaby
 

1972 births
Big beat musicians
Freelance musicians
Japanese DJs
Japanese male composers
Living people
Musicians from Hokkaido
Sega people
Video game composers
Japanese electronic musicians